Luca Belardinelli (born 14 March 2001) is an Italian professional footballer who plays as a defensive midfielder for  club Südtirol, on loan from Empoli.

Club career
Belardinelli was raised in the youth system of Empoli and was first called up to the senior team in January 2019.

For the 2021–22 season, he was loaned to Pro Vercelli in Serie C.

On 9 July 2022, Belardinelli joined Südtirol in Serie B on loan. He made his Serie B debut for Südtirol on 14 August 2022 in a game against Brescia.

International career
Belardinelli represented Italy in friendlies for the Under-18 and Under-19 squads.

References

External links
 

2001 births
Sportspeople from Ravenna
Footballers from Emilia-Romagna
Living people
Italian footballers
Italy youth international footballers
Association football midfielders
Empoli F.C. players
F.C. Pro Vercelli 1892 players
F.C. Südtirol players
Serie C players
Serie B players